YouTube Creator Awards, commonly known as YouTube Play Buttons or YouTube Plaques, are a series of awards from YouTube that aim to recognize its most popular channels. They are based on a channel's subscriber count but are offered at the sole discretion of YouTube. Each channel is reviewed before an award is issued, to ensure that the channel follows the YouTube community guidelines. YouTube reserves the right to refuse to hand out a Creator Award, which it has done for channels featuring horror or extremist political content.

Awards 
When a YouTube channel reaches a specific milestone and is deemed eligible for a YouTube Creator Reward, they are awarded a relatively flat trophy in a metal casing with a YouTube play button symbol. The trophies are of different sizes: each button and plaque gets progressively bigger with the channel's subscriber count. The Gold Creator Award was introduced at VidCon 2012, alongside the Silver Creator Award at VidCon 2013 and the Diamond Creator Award at VidCon 2015. The Creator Awards are made by the New York firm Society Awards.

Prior to March 2021, YouTube featured three additional benefit levels. These are not eligible for Creator Rewards, but they do offer several preliminary benefits:
 Graphite was for channels with 1 to 999 subscribers. 
 Opal was for channels with 1,000 to 9,999 subscribers. This is the minimum subscriber count required for the YouTube Partner Program, which also requires a minimum of 4,000 total viewer watch hours in the past 12 months, plus a manual review of the channel's content to determine compliance with the program guidelines.
 Bronze was for channels with 10,000 to 99,999 subscribers. The YouTube NextUp program is exclusive to channels meeting this threshold and other program criteria. This is also the minimum subscriber count required for a Spreadshop or Teespring merchandise shelf.

There are currently three regular Creator Awards tiers, plus a fourth and fifth that have been awarded a few times:

Silver Creator Award 

Awarded to channels that reach or surpass 100,000 subscribers. The old version was made of nickel-plated cupronickel alloy. The new version (as of March 1, 2017) is 92% nickel, 5% carbon and 2.5% zinc, with traces of other metals. In March 2018, the look of the Silver Play Button was updated from a metal button housed within a window box with the channel's name printed on the front glass pane to a cleaner-looking flat designed metal plaque award featuring the channel's name embossed on it. Channels at this level are also eligible to apply for a digital verification badge.

Gold Creator Award 

Awarded to channels that reach or surpass 1,000,000 subscribers. It is made of gold-plated brass. In March 2018, the look of the Gold Play Button was updated from a metal button housed within a window box with the channel's name printed on the front glass pane to a cleaner-looking flat designed metal plaque award featuring the channel's name embossed on it.

Diamond Creator Award 

Awarded to channels that reach or surpass 10 million subscribers. It is made of silver-plated metal inset with a large piece of colorless crystal in the shape of a play button triangle. When introduced during VidCon 2015, 35 channels qualified for the award. As of January 11, 2023, there are 985 channels that have 10 million subscribers or more.

Custom Creator Award 

Formerly awarded to channels that reach or surpass 50 million subscribers. Since September 1, 2020, it is the sole award to be missing from the Creator Awards FAQ. However, it continued to be granted at YouTube's discretion after this date. PewDiePie gave the nickname of Ruby Creator Award to this award, as he received a ruby-colored award in the shape of his channel's logo. The color can vary per creator, however: for example, T-Series received a colorless award, while Blackpink received a black award on top of a pink base. Channels with a dagger symbol have presented their Custom Creator Award to the public. , 17 channels have reached this level:

 PewDiePie (December 8, 2016)
 T-Series (June 27, 2018)
 5-Minute Crafts (February 21, 2019)
 Cocomelon (June 7, 2019)
 SET India (June 20, 2019)
 Canal Kondzilla (June 21, 2019)
 WWE (October 24, 2019)
 Justin Bieber (February 3, 2020)
 Zee Music Company (February 7, 2020)
 Like Nastya Vlog (March 13, 2020)
 Dude Perfect (March 24, 2020)
 Kids Diana Show (March 30, 2020)
 Vlad and Niki (August 18, 2020)
 Zee TV (September 2, 2020)
 Blackpink (October 4, 2020)
 Marshmello (November 22, 2020)
 MrBeast (January 4, 2021)

Red Diamond Creator Award 

Awarded to channels that reach or surpass 100 million subscribers. Inspired by the Diamond Creator Award, it features a play button triangle with a large dark red crystal. It was added to the Creator Awards FAQ by September 1, 2020. There are currently seven channels that have reached this level:

 T-Series (May 29, 2019)
 PewDiePie (August 25, 2019)
 Cocomelon (December 12, 2020)
 SET India (March 28, 2021)
 MrBeast (July 28, 2022)
 Kids Diana Show (August 16, 2022)
 Like Nastya (August 25, 2022)

Notes

References

External links
 

Creator Awards
Awards established in 2012